Josh Brindell-South (born 1992) is an Australian footballer who plays as a left back for A-League club Brisbane Roar.

Playing career

Wellington Phoenix
Brindell-South signed a 1-year contract with the Phoenix and new coach Ernie Merrick in September 2013. He made 3 appearances for the club in 2013–14, including 2 starts. He suffered a season-ending injury to his ankle in a 1–1 home draw with the Perth Glory on 9 March 2014.

Brisbane Roar
In October 2020, Brindell-South joined Queensland's A-League club, Brisbane Roar.

References

External links
 footballaustralia.com.au profile

1992 births
Soccer players from Brisbane
Association football defenders
Wellington Phoenix FC players
Brisbane Roar FC players
A-League Men players
New Zealand Football Championship players
National Premier Leagues players
Living people
Australian soccer players